Intuitive Machines, Inc. is a publicly-traded American company headquartered in Houston, Texas. It was founded in 2013 by Stephen Altemus, Kam Ghaffarian, and Tim Crain. Intuitive Machines is completing its lunar program which will provide lunar surface access, lunar orbit delivery, and communications at lunar distance. Intuitive Machines holds three NASA contracts, under the space agency's Commercial Lunar Payload Services (CLPS) initiative, to deliver payloads to the lunar surface.  The formerly privately-held Intuitive Machines, LLC completed a merger with special-purpose acquisition company (SPAC) Inflection Point Acquisition Corp. in February 2023, and incorporated in the State of Delaware.

Overview
Intuitive Machines has designed some airborne drones and spacecraft, including the Universal Reentry Vehicle (URV), the Nova-C lunar lander, and other flight instrument systems.

In November 2018, it was selected by NASA as one of the 9 companies granted the right to bid on the Commercial Lunar Payload Services program (CLPS). Their lander, Nova-C, will be proposed to NASA's CLPS as the first lander of this program, that is focused on the exploration and use of natural resources of the Moon.

On 31 May 2019, NASA announced it had awarded Intuitive Machines $77 million to build and launch their Nova-C Moon lander.

On 13 April 2020, Intuitive Machines, under contract to carry NASA science instruments to the Moon on a privately developed robotic spacecraft, said that its first commercial lunar mission would target landing near a deep, narrow valley named Vallis Schröteri. Vallis Schröteri is located on the upper left part of the Moon's near side, as viewed from the northern hemisphere on Earth. The Nova-C Moon lander developed by Intuitive Machines would attempt to land on a relatively flat area near Vallis Schröteri in a region named Oceanus Procellarum, also known as the Ocean of Storms. NASA considered sending the Apollo 18 mission to land in the same area, but the flight was canceled. By April 2021, however, the landing site had been changed to an unspecified location between Mare Serenitatis and Mare Crisium. Intuitive Machines announced in October 2019 that its first Nova-C lander would launch on a SpaceX Falcon 9 rocket. The company said on 13 April 2020 that its first lunar mission, designated IM-1, was scheduled for launch as soon as 11 October 2021, on a Falcon 9 rocket from pad LC-39A at Kennedy Space Center of the NASA in Florida. As of May 2022, IM-1 was scheduled to launch on 22 December 2022, but in November 2022, IM-1 was scheduled for March 2023 earliest.

The Intuitive Machines contract with NASA is valued at $77 million, covering transportation and operations at the Moon for five NASA science instruments. Intuitive Machines previously said the first Nova-C lander was scheduled for launch in July 2021. Josh Marshall, a company spokesperson, said on 15 April 2020, that the mission was pushed back three months due to impacts from a protest to the company's contract award by Deep Space Systems. Deep Space Systems also bid for the contracts that were ultimately won by Intuitive Machines and Astrobotic Technology. After a review, the Government Accountability Office (GAO) upheld NASA's selection of Intuitive Machines and Astrobotic Technology, allowing work on the CLPS missions to proceed.

In September 2022 Intuitive Machines announced that it would merge into special-purpose acquisition company (SPAC) Inflection Point Acquisition Corp. (IPAX) and incorporate as a publicly-held company. The transaction was approved by IPAX's shareholders on 8 February 2023 and the business combination was completed on 13 February. The stock of the newly-named Intuitive Machines, Inc., began trading on the Nasdaq exchange on 14 February 2023.

References

2013 establishments in Texas
Aerospace companies of the United States
American companies established in 2013
Manufacturing companies based in Houston
Publicly traded companies of the United States
Technology companies established in 2013
Transportation companies based in Texas